The 16"/45 caliber gun (spoken "sixteen-inch-forty-five-caliber") was used for the main batteries of the last class of Standard-type battleships for the United States Navy, the .

Design
The 16-inch gun was a built-up gun constructed in a length of 45 calibers. The Mark 1 had an A tube, jacket, liner, and seven hoops, four locking rings and a screw-box liner. When the gun was designed in August 1913 it was referred to as the "Type Gun (45 Cal.)" as an effort to conceal the gun's true size of 16 inches. Gun No. 1, the prototype, was proof fired in July 1914, less than a year after it was designed. After some minor changes the gun was re-proofed in May 1916 with production approved in January 1917, for Gun Nos. 2–41. Bethlehem Steel was given a contract for 20 guns and an additional 20 castings were ordered from Watervliet Arsenal for assembly at the US Naval Gun Factory at the Washington Navy Yard.

The Mark 1 guns were upgraded to Marks 5 and 8 in the late 1930s. The Mark 5s have a larger chamber to permit larger charges and a new liner with a heavier taper carbon steel along with a liner locking ring and locking collar. The Mark 8, similar to the Mark 5, had a uniform rifling with a chromium plated bore for increased life.

Naval service

See also
 List of naval guns

Weapons of comparable role, performance and era
 BL 16 inch Mk I naval gun : British equivalent
 41 cm/45 3rd Year Type naval gun : Japanese equivalent

References

External links
 Bluejackets Manual, 1917, 4th revision: US Navy 14-inch Mark 1 gun

Naval guns of the United States
400 mm artillery
 Military equipment introduced in the 1920s